Santa Clara County v. Southern Pacific Railroad Company, 118 U.S. 394 (1886), is a corporate law case of the United States Supreme Court concerning taxation of railroad properties. The case is most notable for a headnote stating that the Equal Protection Clause of the Fourteenth Amendment grants constitutional protections to corporations.

The case arose when several railroads refused to follow a California state law that gave less favorable tax treatment to some assets owned by corporations as compared to assets owned by individuals. The Court's opinions in earlier cases such as Dartmouth College v. Woodward had recognized that corporations were entitled to some of the protections of the Constitution. Associate Justice John Marshall Harlan's majority opinion held for the railroads, but his opinion did not address the Equal Protection Clause. However, a headnote written by the Reporter of Decisions and approved by Chief Justice Morrison Waite stated that the Supreme Court justices unanimously believed that the Equal Protection Clause did grant constitutional protections to corporations. The headnote marked the first occasion on which the Supreme Court indicated that the Equal Protection Clause granted constitutional protections to corporations as well as to natural persons.

Facts
At the California Constitutional Convention of 1878–79, the state legislature drew up a new constitution that denied railroads "the right to deduct the amount of their debts [i.e., mortgages] from the taxable value of their property, a right which was given to individuals." Southern Pacific Railroad Company refused to pay taxes under these new changes. The taxpaying railroads challenged this law, based on a conflicting federal statute of 1866 which gave them privileges inconsistent with state taxation (14 Stat. 292, §§ 1, 2, 3, 11, 18).

San Mateo County, along with neighboring counties, filed suit against the railroads to recoup the massive losses in tax revenue stemming from Southern Pacific's refusal to pay. After hearing arguments in San Mateo County v. Southern Pacific Railroad Company, the California Supreme Court sided with the county.

The Supreme Court of the United States issued an opinion consolidating three separate cases: Santa Clara County v. Southern Pacific Railroad Company, California v. Central Pacific Railroad Company, and California v. Southern Pacific Railroad Company.

Headnote

The headnote, which is "not the work of the Court, but is simply the work of the Reporter, giving his understanding of the decision, prepared for the convenience of the profession", was written by the Reporter of Decisions, former president of the Newburgh and New York Railway Company J.C. Bancroft Davis. He said the following:

One of the points made and discussed at length in the brief of counsel for defendants in error was that 'corporations are persons within the meaning of the Fourteenth Amendment to the Constitution of the United States.' Before argument, Mr. Chief Justice Waite said: The court does not wish to hear argument on the question whether the provision in the Fourteenth Amendment to the Constitution, which forbids a State to deny to any person within its jurisdiction the equal protection of the laws, applies to these corporations. We are all of the opinion that it does.

So the headnote was a reporting by the Reporter of Decisions of the Chief Justice's interpretation of the Justices' opinions. But the issue of applicability of "Equal Protection to any persons" to the railroads was not addressed in the decision of the Court in the case.

Before publication in United States Reports, Davis wrote a letter to Chief Justice Morrison Waite, dated May 26, 1886, to make sure his headnote was correct:

Dear Chief Justice,

I have a memorandum in the California Cases Santa Clara County v. Southern Pacific &c
As follows. In opening the Court stated that it did not wish to hear argument on the question whether the Fourteenth Amendment applies to such corporations as are parties in these suits. All the Judges were of the opinion that it does.

Waite replied:

I think your mem. in the California Railroad Tax cases expresses with sufficient accuracy what was said before the argument began. I leave it with you to determine whether anything need be said about it in the report inasmuch as we avoided meeting the constitutional question in the decision.

C. Peter Magrath, who discovered the exchange while researching Morrison R. Waite: The Triumph of Character, writes "In other words, to the Reporter fell the decision which enshrined the declaration in the United States Reports...had Davis left it out, Santa Clara County v. Southern Pac. R. Co. would have been lost to history among thousands of uninteresting tax cases." At the same time, the correspondence makes clear that the headnote does reflect the Court's thinking, at least before hearing any arguments to the contrary.

Author Jack Beatty wrote about the lingering questions as to how the reporter's note reflected a quotation that was absent from the opinion itself.
Why did the chief justice issue his dictum? Why did he leave it up to Davis to include it in the headnotes? After Waite told him that the Court 'avoided' the issue of corporate personhood, why did Davis include it? Why, indeed, did he begin his headnote with it? The opinion made plain that the Court did not decide the corporate personality issue and the subsidiary equal protection issue.

Defense argument
While the decision of the Court did not rest on the Fourteenth Amendment, an argument on this ground had been delivered by the defense:

That the provisions of the Constitution and laws of California in respect to the assessment for taxation of the property of railway corporations operating railroads in more than one county, are in violation of the Fourteenth Amendment of the Constitution insofar as they require the assessment of their property at its full money value without making deduction, as in the case of railroads operated in one county and of other corporations and of natural persons, for the value of the mortgages covering the property assessed, thus imposing upon the defendant unequal burdens, and to that extent denying to it the equal protection of the laws.

Judgment
A unanimous decision, written by Justice Harlan, ruled on the matter of fences, holding that the state of California illegally included the fences running beside the tracks in its assessment of the total value of the railroad's property. As a result, the county could not collect taxes from Southern Pacific that it was not allowed to collect in the first place. This meant that the more significant question of the Equal Protection Clause was never actually addressed.

Significance
Thus the Supreme Court's actual decision never hinged on the equal protection claims. Nevertheless, the case has been allowed to have clear constitutional consequences, as it has been subsequently cited as affirming the protection of corporations under the Fourteenth Amendment. At the very least, this is an unusual exception to the normal understanding of the workings of the Court's rule of stare decisis – the reliance on precedent. It is an instance in which a statement which is neither part of the ruling of the Court, nor part of the opinion of a majority or dissenting minority of the Court has been cited as precedent in subsequent decisions of the Court.

In his dissent in the 1938 case of Connecticut General Life Insurance Company v. Johnson, Justice Hugo Black wrote 
in 1886, this Court in the case of Santa Clara County v. Southern Pacific Railroad, decided for the first time that the word 'person' in the amendment did in some instances include corporations. [...] The history of the amendment proves that the people were told that its purpose was to protect weak and helpless human beings and were not told that it was intended to remove corporations in any fashion from the control of state governments. [...] The language of the amendment itself does not support the theory that it was passed for the benefit of corporations.

Justice William O. Douglas wrote in 1949, 
the Santa Clara case becomes one of the most momentous of all our decisions. [...] Corporations were now armed with constitutional prerogatives.

See also

United States corporate law
Corporate personhood
Juristic person
Johnson v. Southern Pacific Co.: U.S. Supreme Court case involving Southern Pacific's unsuccessful challenge to a federal safety law
Southern Pacific Company v. Arizona: U.S. Supreme Court case involving Southern Pacific's successful challenge to a state safety law
List of United States Supreme Court cases, volume 118
Citizens United v. Federal Election Commission
McCutcheon v. FEC

Notes

References

External links

 Library of resources on Corporate Personhood, including many addressing the Santa Clara decision (ReclaimDemocracy.org).
 Barry Yeoman, When Is a Corporation Like a Freed Slave?, Mother Jones
"Unequal Protection: The Rise of Corporate Dominance and the Theft of Human Rights" by Thom Hartmann

Railway litigation in 1886
1886 in United States case law
Southern Pacific Railroad
United States corporate case law
United States equal protection case law
United States Supreme Court cases
United States Supreme Court cases of the Waite Court
Corporate personhood
History of Santa Clara County, California
Legal history of California